Grândola e Santa Margarida da Serra is a civil parish in the municipality of Grândola, Portugal. It was formed in 2013 by the merger of the former parishes Grândola and Santa Margarida da Serra. The population in 2011 was 10,834, in an area of 416.25 km2.

References

Freguesias of Grândola